A number of steamships were named Marsland, including:
, a British cargo ship in service 1926–33
, a British cargo ship in service 1930−33
, a British cargo ship in service 1951−60

Ship names